Żabno may refer to the following places:
Żabno, Kuyavian-Pomeranian Voivodeship (north-central Poland)
Żabno in Lesser Poland Voivodeship (south Poland)
Żabno, Lublin Voivodeship (east Poland)
Żabno, Subcarpathian Voivodeship (south-east Poland)
Żabno, Greater Poland Voivodeship (west-central Poland)
Żabno, Bytów County in Pomeranian Voivodeship (north Poland)
Żabno, Lubusz Voivodeship (west Poland)
Żabno, Chojnice County in Pomeranian Voivodeship (north Poland)
Żabno, Starogard County in Pomeranian Voivodeship (north Poland)
Żabno, West Pomeranian Voivodeship (north-west Poland)